Chasing Farrah is  an American reality television series starring Farrah Fawcett, which aired on TV Land in early 2005.

Synopsis
The series followed actress Farrah Fawcett in her day-to-day life.

Episodes

External links
 
 Gone Public (A lament for the good old days)
 'Chasing Farrah' a parody out of time

2005 American television series debuts
2005 American television series endings
2000s American reality television series
English-language television shows
TV Land original programming